PPG Institute of Technology(PPGIT), located at Coimbatore, Tamil Nadu, India is a private self-financing engineering institute. The college is approved by AICTE and is affiliated to the Anna University Coimbatore. The college has been established from the academic year 2008-2009.

Location 
The college is located in Vilankurichi, Saravanampatty(PO), Rathinagiri Road, 300 Metres from Sathy Road(NH-209), Coimbatore.

Academics 
The college offers Six courses leading to the Degree of Bachelor of Engineering(B.E.) and one course leading to Bachelor of Technology (B.Tech.) of the Anna University Chennai

B.E.

Admission procedure
The Undergraduate students are admitted based on their 12th standard (higher secondary school) scores. The admissions are done as per the Government of Tamil Nadu norms through State Government Counselling(TNEA)and through regulated management seat procedures.

References

External links 
 PPG Institute of Technology official site

Engineering colleges in Coimbatore